Avian humanoids (people with the characteristics of birds) are a common motif in folklore and popular fiction, mainly found in Greek, Roman, Meitei, Hindu, Persian mythology, etc.

Folklore
Alkonost from Russian mythology
 Almost all of the Anemoi, best depicted on the Tower of the Winds
 Angels in all Abrahamic religions, though mainly in artistic depictions 
 Anzû from Mesopotamian mythology, either a lesser divinity or a monster
 Arke, Iris' sister who also had wings, said to be iridescent
 Ba, the part of a human's soul that roughly represents its personality, depicted as a bird with a human head
 Calais and Zetes, sons of the North Wind Boreas
 Chareng-Aka Uchek Langmeidong, it is a mythical creature, from Meitei mythology in the form a semi human and semi hornbill, with an avian body and a human head. 
 The Ekek in Philippine mythology is depicted as a humanoid with bird wings and a beak
 Eos is often depicted as winged in art
 Eris (mythology) was depicted as winged in ancient Greek art
 Eros/Cupid is often depicted as winged
 The Faravahar of Zoroastrianism
 Gamayun from Russian mythology
 The Garuda, eagle-man mount of Vishnu in Hindu mythology, was pluralized into a class of bird-like beings in Buddhist mythology.

 Geryon, a giant defeated by Hercules who, in one account, was described as having wings and some mid-sixth-century Chalcidian vases portray him as winged
 Harpies, bird-women associated with storm winds known for terrorizing mortals
 The gods Horus and Thoth from ancient Egyptian mythology were often depicted as humans with the heads of a falcon and an ibis, respectively.
 Huitzilopochtli, "hummingbird's south" or "hummingbird's left"; Aztec god of the sun and war who was often depicted as either a hummingbird or an eagle
 Iris (mythology) was said to have golden wings with "golden-winged" as one of her epithets and was often depicted in art as having wings 
 Isis and her sister Nephthys were ancient Egyptian goddesses commonly depicted with kite (bird) heads or wings attached to their arms
 The Kinnara and Kinnari in southeast Asia are two of the most beloved mythological characters, who are benevolent half-human, half-bird creatures
 Karura in Japanese folklore
 Lamassu from Mesopotamian mythology, a winged protective deity
 Lei Gong, a Chinese thunder god, often depicted as a bird man
 Langmeidong-It is a mythology creature from Meitei mythology, in the form of a semi human, semi hornbill, with an avian body and a human head. 
 The second people of the world in Southern Sierra Miwok mythology
 Morpheus, son of Hypnos and a god of dreams
 Neith, Egyptian goddess sometimes portrayed as having bird wings attached to her arms
 Nemesis was described as winged by Mesomedes and is often portrayed as such in art
 Nightingale the Robber in Slavic folklore, who is killed by the hero Ilya Muromets
 Nike is very famous for her birdlike wings
 Pamola, a bird-man from Abenaki mythology
 Peri, beautiful, winged women from Persian folklore
 Ra, an ancient Egyptian sun god often depicted with a falcon's head
 Sirens from Greek mythology started out as women-bird hybrids, but later evolved to become closer to mermaids
 Sirin, Russian take on the siren that's closer to their original depiction as birds
 The swan maidens in the folktales of cultures such as Sweden, Germany, Romania, Serbia, Japan, and Pakistan
Suparnas from Hinduism who can appear as part man and part bird
 Tangata manu of Easter Island, often depicted as a frigate bird/human hybrid
 The Tengu of Japanese folklore, monstrous forest and mountain dwelling humanoids often possessing the wings, claws, and sometimes the beak of a bird.
 Thanatos and his brother Hypnos were often portrayed as winged
 "Uchek Langmeidong"-In Meitei mythology and folklore, it is a mythical creature, semi human, semi hornbill, with an avian body and a human head. The bird is a form of a hornbill bird. 
 Wayland the Smith from Germanic mythology; scholars differ on whether they think he organically grew wings to escape imprisonment or fashioned artificial ones like Daedalus
 Winged genie, recurring motif in Assyrian art; they're bearded men with birds' wings

Fiction
 The Aarakocra and the Kenku are two playable avian humanoid races in the Dungeons & Dragons fantasy roleplaying game.
 The Chozo civilization, a highly intelligent and technologically advanced bird-like species in the Metroid series.
 The winged people of Normnbdsgrsutt in Robert Paltock's utopian fantasy Peter Wilkins (1750), including Youwarkee, whom Peter marries.
 The Flock from James Patterson's Maximum Ride novel series.
 The bird people of Brontitall, led by The Wise Old Bird, in The Hitchhiker's Guide to the Galaxy are depicted by Douglas Adams as evolving from humans who are so sick of buying shoes that they become bird-like creatures and never set foot on the ground again (see Shoe Event Horizon).
 The race of garuda in fantasy author China Miéville's world Bas-Lag as featured in Perdido Street Station.
 In J.K. Rowling's Harry Potter series, a race of magical creatures called Veela appear as extraordinarily beautiful women, but turn into frightening bird-like creatures when angered.
 Vergere in The New Jedi Order book series in the Star Wars expanded universe is of the Fosh species, capable of producing tears that can be used as poison or healing.
 The Rito in The Legend of Zelda game series.
 The Shi'ar from Marvel Comics, a species of cold-blooded humanoids of avian descent; they resemble humans with feathered crests atop their heads in lieu of hair. 
 The Tirkin from the Xenoblade Chronicles series, a type of enemy which are shown to be able to use tools and are capable of speech. 

 The Illyrians from A Court of Thorns And Roses series by Sarah J. Maas. They are a warrior race of faeries living in the mountains. Illyrians have wings similar to bat wings. 
 Birdperson, a character from the television series Rick and Morty, is a tall humanoid with two giant eagle wings. He is later renamed "Phoenixperson." 
 Prince Vultan's hawkmen from the 1980 space opera film Flash Gordon.
 Turians from the Mass Effect series, a warrior race with avian features.
 Arakkoas from the World of Warcraft expansions (first appearing in WoW: Burning Crusade), a bird humannoid race with avian features.
 Papi, a harpy from the manga series Monster Musume.
 The Garuda from 'NanoMorphosis' by Marla L. Anderson are a wingless bird-like alien race.

See also
 List of piscine and amphibian humanoids
 List of reptilian humanoids

References

External links
  — This cites .
  — a story from a story teller of the Bird Clan of East Central Alabama that parallels the evolution of birds from dinosaurs

 
 
-
Legendary birds
Lists of fictional humanoid species